Michael Adams may refer to:

Academia
Michael Friedrich Adams (1780–1838), Russian botanist
Michael F. Adams (born 1948), former president of the University of Georgia
J. Michael Adams (1947–2012), president of Fairleigh Dickinson University

Arts and entertainment
Michael Adams (journalist) (1920–2005), who worked for the BBC
Michael Adams (Canadian writer), contributor to The Walrus
Michael Adams (stunt performer) (1950–2010), actor, stunt performer and stunt coordinator
Michael Adams (presenter) (born 1999), British television personality

Politics
Michael Adams (Canadian politician) (1845–1899), Canadian politician
Michael Adams (Kentucky politician) (born 1976), Secretary of State of Kentucky
Michael Adams (Wisconsin politician) (1831–1903), American businessman and politician

Sports
Micky Adams (born 1961), English former professional footballer and current football coach
Michael Adams (basketball) (born 1963), former NBA basketball player
Michael Adams (chess player) (born 1971), English chess grandmaster
Michael Adams (American football) (born 1985), NFL cornerback
Mick Adams (1951–2017), rugby league player

Other people
Michael J. Adams (1930–1967), American test pilot
Michael Adams, co-founder of the Canadian polling firm Environics 
Michael Adams (RAF officer) (1934–2022), British Royal Air Force officer

See also
Mike Adams (disambiguation)
Adams (surname)